The City of Vaughan in Ontario, Canada offers a complex transportation infrastructure, which includes highways, public transit, regional roads, municipality-funded roads, and train services.

Air
Because of Vaughan's proximity to Toronto, Vaughan residents use Toronto Pearson International Airport in order to travel to various domestic and international destinations.

Alternatives to the Toronto Pearson International Airport are available in the nearby city of Markham, where the Toronto/Buttonville Municipal Airport is located. The municipal airport primarily serves York Region, and offers flights to domestic and United States destinations.

Public transportation
Within the city, York Region Transit (YRT), which includes Viva (bus rapid transit); and the Toronto Transit Commission (TTC), provide public transit services. Prior to 2001, Vaughan was served by a municipal-funded transit system, namely Vaughan Transit. In 2001, the York Region government amalgamated the Vaughan Transit with four other municipal-managed transit systems in York Region to form YRT. In 2005, York Region Transit launched Viva, which operated in parts of Vaughan on Highway 7. In addition, GO Transit provides commuter trains and buses.

York Region Transit

YRT serves Vaughan with over 20 routes. Most of its bus routes operate on main roads throughout Vaughan, which is laid out in a grid-like system. Fares are $4.00, regardless of age. The Toronto Transit Commission (TTC) operates one contracted route along Bathurst Street, and a second (TTC or YRT) fare is charged when crossing the city limits at Steeles Avenue in the relevant direction. However, a TTC fare is not charged on YRT buses entering Toronto to make connections at  terminals. York Region Transit allows Vaughan residents to travel around York Region, and to the surrounding Greater Toronto and Hamilton Area with GO Transit Connections.

Connections to other transit systems include Brampton Transit, GO Transit, and the aforementioned TTC.

Viva

Due to the increased congestion on York Region's roads, York Region Transit launched a bus rapid transit (BRT) system on September 4, 2005, and named it Viva, meaning "praised by everyone" in Italian. Unlike regular YRT routes, Viva only stops at Vivastations, specially designed stops which incorporate a ticket vending machine and a ticket validator (fares are on a proof-of-payment basis to speed up boarding times), as well as a real-time "smart" display that notify passengers when the next vehicle is expected to depart. Most Vivastations are blue, but several stops on Yonge Street have a unique bronze design referred to as "vivavintage" in order to better suit the historic areas, especially along Yonge Street in Thornhill, where space is short, and will be served by miniature "vivamicro" stations. YRT fares apply to VIVA.

It is the name for the York Region Rapid Transit Plan, and was funded through a Public-Private Partnership (P3) consortium called the York Region Rapid Transit Corporation. York Region has control over all fares and service planning. Viva service is integrated with YRT's regular transit routes and operated as one regional transit system (1system) that enables customers to travel across the city and region.

The system was opened to public in four stages. The second phase was opened on October 16, 2005, the third phase was opened on November 20, and the first part of the fourth phase was opened on January 2, 2006.

There are four viva lines operating within Vaughan (80% of Viva lines operating within York Region): Viva Blue (on Yonge Street), Viva Orange (on Highway 7), and Viva Pink (an alternative to Viva Blue at peak-hours).

Viva bus lines operate using blue Van Hool and Novabus vehicles. Viva Orange buses use the Highway 7 Rapidway, which are reserved bus lanes in the centre of Highway 7, for part of the route. Viva buses are given priority at traffic signals, meaning that the bus driver can adjust the traffic lights when the bus are behind schedule due to a traffic congestion, significantly improving the efficiency of service. Buses operate 18 hours a day, 7 days per week, including holidays. Bus frequency ranges from 5 minutes to 15 minutes.

Toronto Transit Commission

In addition to YRT, the Toronto Transit Commission (TTC) also provides some services within the city:

Subway

The TTC's Line 1 Yonge–University subway line travels into Vaughan to Highway 7 and Jane Street and opened on December 17, 2017. The three stations in Vaughan are named Pioneer Village, Highway 407, and Vaughan Metropolitan Centre. Unlike the case with TTC-operated buses, no extra fare is charged for travel into Vaughan.
Source:

Bus
There is also one TTC-contracted bus route operating within Vaughan, which serves Bathurst Street. Unlike the subway, a special fare policy applies to this route. If a passenger boards a TTC contracted bus in Vaughan, and only travels within Vaughan, the passenger may transfer to YRT operated bus routes without paying a second fare. If a passenger boards in Vaughan and travels into Toronto (or from Toronto into York), they must pay an extra fare to continue their trip into the other transit system's territory. There were formerly five TTC-contracted bus routes serving major north–south streets which continued north from Toronto prior to the subway extension, but four were replaced with YRT routes due to route restructuring after the subway opened.

Rail

The Barrie line, operated by GO Transit, provides the only passenger service to Vaughan. The two stations in the city are Rutherford GO Station, located in Rutherford Road east of Keele Street and south of Rutherford Road, and Maple GO Station in Maple, located north of Major Mackenzie Drive and east of Keele Street. The line terminates at Barrie in the north and at Union Station in Toronto in the south.

Roads

In terms of road systems, Vaughan is strongly influenced by its southerly neighbour, Toronto. Vaughan inherits a grid-like road network, funded by three levels of government. The government of Ontario funds the provincial highways across the town; the government of York Region funds most of its arterial and main routes throughout the town; and the government of Vaughan funds all local routes, and some arterial routes.

Provincial highways

The Ontario government only funded certain roads across Vaughan, and designates them as Ontario Provincial Highways. These include Highways 400 and 427. Highway 400 serves as a major expressway linking Toronto, Vaughan, and Northern Ontario. Prior to the 1998 massive downloading, the Ontario government also maintained Highway 7 (now York Regional Road 7), Highway 11 (now York Regional Road 1, locally known as Yonge Street), and Highway 27 (now York Regional Road 27).

York Regional Roads

Majority of the main routes are urban "county" roads maintained by York Region. Each one of them is assigned with a number, each shown by a shield shaped like a flowerpot. York Regional Roads, like roads in Toronto, are laid out in a grid-like system. Most of the north–south routes continue street names from Toronto. The York Regional Roads are laid out in a grid pattern about two kilometres apart. The regional road system is particularly successful due to the landscape across Vaughan and York Region being relatively flat.

Most of the York Regional Roads within Vaughan are four or six lanes, with a few exceptions in the rural areas to the north and west, where they are mostly two lanes.

Municipal roads

The City of Vaughan also funds some of the main routes, and all of the light-duty roads. Major roads that are funded by Vaughan are favourited by motorists for travelling within the town. Most cars wanting to visit other nearby municipalities must use York Regional Roads, therefore, although they are called the "Municipal main streets", they are relatively light duty. These roads often serve as an alternative to car jammed York Regional Roads. The City of Vaughan also funds almost all residential streets across the town.

Privately controlled

In addition, Highway 407 Express Toll Route (407 ETR) is a toll, major east–west expressway, and is privately controlled. The route was provincial controlled, but is now privately owned. The highway serves as a by-pass to Highway 401 and Highway 7, which are very busy roadways. Users using the Highway 407 must pay a certain fare which is invoiced to them monthly.

Cameras installed on on- and off-ramps of Highway 407 capture either the rear license plate number or transponder information from vehicles using the road. Transponders can be leased from Highway 407 for automobile users. Vehicles over five tonnes must use a transponder to use the road. Vehicle owners without a transponder are charged a "video toll charge" in addition to regular toll charges per distance traveled.

Highway 407 has an arrangement with the Ontario Ministry of Transportation requiring that all outstanding fees must be paid in order for drivers to renew their driving licenses.

Highway 407 primarily serves Vaughan from York Regional Road 1 (Yonge Street) to York Regional Road 24 (Highway 50). The highway connects Vaughan with Pickering to the east, and Burlington to the west.

References

Transport in Vaughan